Pomatocalpa marsupiale, commonly known as the branched bladder orchid, is an epiphytic or lithophytic orchid that forms large clumps. It has many thick roots, branched stems, many strap-like, leathery leaves and up to many upward-facing green flowers with a cream-coloured or yellowish labellum. It usually grows on high on rainforest trees and is found between Sulawesi and tropical North Queensland, Australia.

Description

The sepals and petals spread widely apart from each other. Flowering occurs from November to May.

The branched bladder orchid is differentiated from the other Australian Pomatocalpa species, P. macphersonii (blotched bladder orchid), by its taller, upright stems, larger leaves, crowded flowers, flower color, and bloom time.

Taxonomy and naming
The branched bladder orchid was first formally described in 1889 by Friedrich Kraenzlin as Cleisostoma marsupiale. He published the description in Die Flora von Kaiser Wilhelms Land. In 1912 Johannes Jacobus Smith changed the name to Pomatocalpa marsupiale. The specific epithet (marsupiale) is derived from the Latin word marsupium meaning "pouch", "bag" or "purse".

Distribution and habitat
Plectorrhiza marsupiale usually grows on tall trees open situations in rainforest.

References

Aeridinae
Epiphytic orchids
Orchids of Queensland
Orchids of New Guinea
Plants described in 1889